1957 Thai general election may refer to:
 February 1957 Thai general election
 December 1957 Thai general election